American Momentum Bank started in 2006 as the largest startup market capitalization of any financial institution in Florida state history with $100 million in start-up capital.

American Momentum Bank is headquartered in College Station, Texas. American Momentum Bank is also a mortgage lender and a regional leader in online banking. They acquired LandMark Bank of Florida and Southshore Community Bank in 2011. In 2012, they completed their acquisition of Brazos Valley Bank in College Station, Texas and switched to a national bank charter.

References

External links 
Company website

Banks based in Florida
Banks established in 2006
Companies based in Tampa, Florida
2006 establishments in Florida